Fflur is a Welsh name meaning "flower". It can be used as both a given name and a surname.

People with the surname include:
 Elin Fflur, Welsh singer and songwriter
People with the given name include:
 Fflur, legendary Welsh maiden who was said to have captured Julius Caesar's heart
 Fflur Dafydd, Welsh novelist, singer-songwriter and musician
Places with the name include:
 Ystrad Fflur, a hamlet and community in Ceredigion

Welsh given names
Surnames of Welsh origin